Meral Akşener (née Gürer, ; born 18 July 1956) is a Turkish politician, teacher, historian and academic who is the founder and current leader of the Good Party (İYİ Party).

Akşener first entered parliament as a deputy of the True Path Party (DYP) in the 1995 and 1999 general election, and served as the interior minister in the coalition government established by Necmettin Erbakan between 1996 and 1997. Distrustful of her coalition partner, she played a key role in the downfall of her own government in the 1997 military memorandum.

Akşener entered the parliament as a deputy of the Nationalist Movement Party (MHP) in the 2007, 2011 and June 2015 general elections, serving as a vice-speaker of the Grand National Assembly from 2007 to 2015. After tensions between her and the MHP's leader Devlet Bahçeli, she was not nominated as an MP for the November 2015 general election. In 2016, she led a group of opposition within the party against Bahçeli. On 25 October 2017, she separated from the MHP and founded the Good Party, of which she is the leader. She was the party's presidential candidate for the 2018 elections. Akşener is a key opposition figure in Turkish politics, and has been dubbed as an "iron lady" by international observers.

Early life
Meral Akşener was born on 18 July 1956, in the Gündoğdu neighbourhood of İzmit, Kocaeli. Her father Tahir Ömer and her mother Sıddıka are Balkan Turks from Macedonia and Thrace. Her paternal side migrated to the Balkans from Büyükkadı, one of the few Alevi Turkmen villages of Diyarbakır. Her parents were among hundreds of thousands who left Greece to resettle in Turkey in 1923.

She studied history at Istanbul University and completed her post-graduate studies at the Social Sciences Institute of Marmara University, earning a Ph.D. in history. She then worked as a lecturer at Yıldız Technical University, Kocaeli University and Marmara University before entering politics.

DYP and interior ministry 
Meral's older brother was president of MHP's İzmit branch, which gave her connections to right-wing politicians. Akşener quit her post as a university department chair and entered politics with the 1994 municipal elections, running for the True Path Party (DYP) as the mayoral candidate for Kocaeli. Catching DYP chairwoman and then prime minister Tansu Çiller's attention, Akşener became the chair of the women's branch of the DYP and entered parliament in the 1995 general election as a DYP deputy from Istanbul province. Akşener was a proponent of governing with the Motherland Party but, lacking a majority, Çiller instead formed a coalition government with Necmettin Erbakan's Islamist Refah Party.

From the outset, Akşener was opposed to the arrangement but Çiller kept her close by appointing her as one of the DYP’s general vice-presidents, as well as giving her responsibility for the party's General Governing Council and women’s and youth issues. Akşener replaced Mehmet Ağar as Minister of the Interior after his resignation due to his involvement in the Susurluk scandal, becoming the first female interior minister in Turkish history.

Akşener replaced many officials with ties to organised crime but even she was implicated when it emerged that she attended a wedding with Ağar and Abdullah Çatlı. Suspicious of her coalition partner, Akşener backed a rejected bill to replace Refah mayors that were governing against secular principles, which contributed to the escalation of the 1997 military memorandum. She was forced out of office following the collapse of the REFAH-DYP (Refahyol) government. By her own account, her tenure as interior minister saw security services conduct "the longest, broadest, and most comprehensive cross-border actions [against the PKK] in history."

In 1999 she was re-elected to parliament as a deputy for Kocaeli province, but sensing DYP's decline, she led a group of DYP members against Çiller by courting other right wing parties. On 4 July 2001, Akşener left the DYP for the "innovative wing" of the Welfare Party, led by Abdullah Gül and Recep Tayyip Erdoğan. The innovative wing founded the AKP on 14 August. However she was dissatisfied with the continuation of the National Outlook (Turkish: Milli Görüş) ideology in the new party, and joined the Nationalist Movement Party (MHP) in 3 November. She immediately became chief advisor for political affairs to the MHP chair Devlet Bahçeli. However like most of the long-established parties, the MHP was ejected from parliament when it wasn't able to clear the 10% threshold for entering parliament in the 2002 election, and Akşener lost her seat.

MHP deputy 
She was MHP's candidate for the Istanbul mayoralty in the 2004 mayoral elections. Akşener rejoined parliament in 2007, representing Istanbul province, and was elected vice-speaker of the parliament alongside Güldal Mumcu, another female politician, serving as Turkey's first female vice-speaker since 1968. She served in the Turkey-China Inter-Parliamentary Friendship Group of the parliament. She was re-elected as an MP in the 2011 and June 2015 general elections. However, she was not included on the MHP's lists for the November 2015 snap election.

When the MHP lost half of its MPs in the election and Bahçeli openly supported Erdoğan; Akşener demanded an extraordinary congress to oust him. On 8 September 2016, she was expelled from the MHP and promised to start her own political party.

Leader of the Good Party

Under her leadership, the Good Party was founded on 25 October 2017. In her first address to her followers, Akşener said she believed that Turkish democracy was "under threat" and that the Good Party wanted a free society and to fix the problems of the Turkish judiciary system.

Akşener further stated that the "media should not be under pressure. Democratic participation, a strong parliament and the national will are irreplaceable. We will democatise the law on political parties along contemporary democratic principles and the criteria of the Venice Commission." Aksener said that many who were joining her movement were young Turkish citizens who were "chafing under the restrictions" imposed by the government on public gatherings, freedom of expression and constraints on the media.

Initially, the Good Party only had five MPs, not enough to form a parliamentary group to participate in an election, but Kemal Kılıçdaroğlu, leader of the Republican People's Party (CHP), transferred 15 MPs to her party to allow it to compete in the 2018 general election. On 1 May, the CHP, Good Party, Felicity Party, and Democrat Party formed the Nation Alliance as an electoral alliance to challenge the People's Alliance made up of the AKP and MHP. Akşener was the Good Party's presidential candidate in the election and received 7.3% of the vote, while her party captured 43 seats.

The Nation Alliance continued with the 2019 local elections. After negotiations between Akşener and Kılıçdaroğlu, the CHP and Good Party agreed to compete in separate provinces, and nominated Mansur Yavaş as a joint candidate for the Ankara mayoralty. The two campaigned together during the election. While the Good Party didn't win any mayoralties, Yavaş won Ankara, the CHP took the cities of Istanbul, Bolu, Antalya, Mersin, Bilecik, Artvin, Ardahan and Kırşehir from the AKP, and the Good Party was the third most popular party. Akşener condemned the decision to repeat the Istanbul Metropolitan Municipality elections. During the election campaign, she toured every district of Istanbul and supported Ekrem İmamoğlu in his campaign.

Akşener has refused to run for president in the presidential election of 2023, instead saying that she would run for prime minister once the opposition is able to return Turkey to a parliamentary system.

On 3 March 2023, Akşener announced that she took the decision to withdraw from the Table of Six and the Nation Alliance, and said her party would not support main opposition CHP leader Kemal Kılıçdaroğlu as the joint candidate in the 2023 presidential election. However on 6 March, she and her party rejoined the Table of Six after intense public criticism and after it was announced that Ekrem İmamoğlu and Mansur Yavaş would be appointed Vice-Presidents if Kılıçdaroğlu wins the presidential election.

Personal life
Meral Gürer married Tuncer Akşener, an engineer, in 1980. Their son, Fatih Akşener, was born in 1984. Meral Akşener has been described as a devout Muslim who prays regularly. She is known to her supporters as Asena, after the mythical she-wolf.

She supports the football teams Galatasaray and Kocaelispor.

Controversies
During the 1990s, Akşener threatened journalists who spoke out against the government, saying: "Until now, we have succeeded in preventing any unwanted event happening. Still we will try. But after today, we know we will have difficulty in holding back our Tansu-Çiller-fanatical youths. We are warning you for the last time."

While Akşener carried out the military's demands in the lead-up to the 1997 military memorandum, one of her appointees was charged with wiretapping high ranking commanders of the Turkish Armed Forces, which created friction between her and the Turkish military. One general allegedly threatened to "impale her like a goose".

Akşener accused Abdullah Öcalan of being "Armenian spawn" (Ermeni tohumu).

Akşener frequently uses nicknames for government-aligned politicians, some of which tend to stick. She dubbed Treasury and Finance Minister Berat Albayrak the "Damat" (royal son-in-law) after his marriage to Esra Erdoğan.

References

External links
 Website of Good Party

1956 births
Living people
People from İzmit
Ministers of the Interior of Turkey
Istanbul University alumni
Nationalist Movement Party politicians
Women government ministers of Turkey
Deputies of Istanbul
Members of the 25th Parliament of Turkey
Members of the 24th Parliament of Turkey
Members of the 23rd Parliament of Turkey
Members of the 21st Parliament of Turkey
Members of the 20th Parliament of Turkey
Members of the 54th government of Turkey
Deputy Speakers of the Grand National Assembly of Turkey
21st-century Turkish women politicians
20th-century Turkish women politicians
Female interior ministers
Female party leaders of Turkey
Good Party politicians
Centre-right politics in Turkey
Turkish Muslims
Turkish political party founders